Badge or BADGE may refer to:

Badge, a display indicating a special accomplishment, or as a symbol of authority:
 Access badge, a credential used to gain entry to an area
 Digital badge, an indicator of accomplishment, skill, quality or interest in various learning environments
 Heraldic badge, a display of allegiance to a royal figure
 Web badge, a small image used on websites to promote a web standard, product, or terms of service
 Pin-back button, in the United Kingdom
 Rebadging, the practice of applying a new brand or trademark to an existing product
 Achievement (video gaming), a secondary goal within a video game
 Electronic badge, a device to show a handle or software

Arts and entertainment
 "Badge" (song) by the 1960s rock group Cream
 "Badge" (Law & Order: Criminal Intent episode), 2001 US TV episode
 The Badge, a 2002 American film
 James Badge Dale, American actor

Other uses
 Bisphenol A diglycidyl ether, a component of epoxy resin
 , an academic degree in France

See also
 Stinking badges, a film quote
 :Category:Badges